The 2014 Prosperita Open was a professional tennis tournament played on clay courts. It was the eleventh edition of the tournament which was part of the 2014 ATP Challenger Tour. It took place in Ostrava, Czech Republic between 28 April and 4 May 2014.

Singles main-draw entrants

Seeds

Other entrants
The following players received wildcards into the singles main draw:
  Radek Štěpánek
  Jakub Lustyk
  Jan Minář
  Adam Pavlásek

The following players received entry from the qualifying draw:
  Marek Michalička
  Riccardo Ghedin
  Artem Smirnov
  Aslan Karatsev

Doubles main-draw entrants

Seeds

Other entrants
The following pairs received wildcards into the doubles main draw:
  Marek Michalička /  Jan Minář
  Jakub Lustyk /  David Novak
  Dominik Kellovsky /  Pavel Šnobel

Champions

Singles

  Andrey Kuznetsov def.  Miloslav Mečíř Jr., 2–6, 6–3, 6–0

Doubles

  Andrey Kuznetsov /  Adrián Menéndez Maceiras def.  Alessandro Motti /  Matteo Viola, 4–6, 6–3, [10–8]

External links
Official Website

Prosperita Open
Prosperita Open
Prosperita Open
Prosperita Open
Prosperita Open